Georgia State Route 1 Business may refer to:

 Georgia State Route 1 Business (Attapulgus): a business route of State Route 1 that exists in Attapulgus
 Georgia State Route 1 Business (Bainbridge): a business route of State Route 1 that exists in Bainbridge
 Georgia State Route 1 Business (Blakely): a business route of State Route 1 that exists in Blakely
 Georgia State Route 1 Business (Bremen): a business route of State Route 1 that exists in Bremen
 Georgia State Route 1 Business (Buchanan): a business route of State Route 1 that exists in Buchanan
 Georgia State Route 1 Business (Cedartown): a business route of State Route 1 that exists in Cedartown
 Georgia State Route 1 Business (Columbus): a former business route of State Route 1 that existed in Columbus
 Georgia State Route 1 Business (Cuthbert): a business route of State Route 1 that exists in Cuthbert
 Georgia State Route 1 Business (LaFayette): a business route of State Route 1 that exists in LaFayette

001 Business